Caesar E. Farah (March 13, 1929 - November 26, 2009) was a professor of history at the University of Minnesota.

Farah was born in Portland, Oregon, and received a B.A. (1952) from Stanford University, before then studying at Princeton University, where he received an M.A. (1955) and Ph.D. (1957). After serving as a cultural affairs officer in New Delhi and Karachi, he began his teaching career at Portland State College from 1959-1963, teaching history and Near Eastern languages. From 1963-1964, Farah taught at Los Angeles State College, and then became Associate Professor of Near Eastern Language and Literature at Indiana University in Bloomington, 1964-1969. He joined the faculty of the University of Minnesota as Professor of Middle Eastern Studies in 1969, and remained there until his retirement in 2008.

Works
 The Eternal Message of Muhammad Dec 28, 1993
 An Arab's Journey to Colonial Spanish America: The Travels of Elias Al-Musili in the Seventeenth Century Nov 2003
 The Sultan's Yemen: 19th-Century Challenges to Ottoman Rule Jun 29, 2002
 Islam Belief's and Observances
 Arabs and Young Turks: Ottomanism, Arabian and Islamism in the Ottoman Empire 1908-1918 Jun 22, 1998
 Modernization in the Middle East: The Ottoman Empire and Its Afro-Asian Successors
 Islam Jan 2000
 A guide to current research on Yemen 1987
 The dhayl in medieval Arabic historiography 1967

References

1929 births
2009 deaths
Arab scholars
20th-century American historians
Stanford University alumni
Princeton University alumni